New Sobriety may refer to:

The "New Sobriety Movement", or Neo-prohibitionism
New Objectivity, an artistic movement in Weimar Germany